Proux is a French surname. Notable people with the surname include:

Étienne Proux (1897–1983), French Olympic triple jumper
Vanessa Proux (born 1974), French biologist

French-language surnames